The q-exponential distribution is a probability distribution arising from the maximization of the Tsallis entropy under appropriate constraints, including constraining the domain to be positive.  It is one example of a Tsallis distribution. The q-exponential is a generalization of the exponential distribution in the same way that Tsallis entropy is a generalization of standard Boltzmann–Gibbs entropy or Shannon entropy. The exponential distribution is recovered as 

Originally proposed by the statisticians George Box and David Cox in 1964, and known as the reverse Box–Cox transformation for  a particular case of power transform in statistics.

Characterization

Probability density function
The q-exponential distribution has the probability density function

where

is the q-exponential if . When , eq(x) is just exp(x).

Derivation
In a similar procedure to how the exponential distribution can be derived (using the standard Boltzmann–Gibbs entropy or Shannon entropy and constraining the domain of the variable to be positive), the q-exponential distribution can be derived from a maximization of the Tsallis Entropy subject to the appropriate constraints.

Relationship to other distributions
The q-exponential is a special case of the generalized Pareto distribution where

The q-exponential is the generalization of the Lomax distribution (Pareto Type II), as it extends this distribution to the cases of finite support. The Lomax parameters are:

As the Lomax distribution is a shifted version of the Pareto distribution, the q-exponential is a shifted reparameterized generalization of the Pareto. When , the q-exponential is equivalent to the Pareto shifted to have support starting at zero. Specifically, if

then

Generating random deviates
Random deviates can be drawn using inverse transform sampling. Given a variable U that is uniformly distributed on the interval (0,1), then

where  is the q-logarithm and

Applications 

Being a power transform, it is a usual technique in statistics for stabilizing the variance, making the data more normal distribution-like and improving the validity of measures of association such as the Pearson correlation between variables. 
It has been found to be an accurate model for train delays.
It is also found in atomic physics and quantum optics, for example processes of molecular condensate creation via transition through the Feshbach resonance.

See also 

 Constantino Tsallis
 Tsallis statistics
 Tsallis entropy
 Tsallis distribution
 q-copula
 q-Gaussian

Notes

Further reading
Juniper, J. (2007) "The Tsallis Distribution and Generalised Entropy: Prospects for Future Research into Decision-Making under Uncertainty", Centre of Full Employment and Equity, The University of Newcastle, Australia

External links 
 Tsallis Statistics, Statistical Mechanics for Non-extensive Systems and Long-Range Interactions

Statistical mechanics
Continuous distributions
Probability distributions with non-finite variance